Ropalidia is a large genus of eusocial paper wasps in the tribe Ropalidiini distributed throughout the Afrotropical, Indomalayan and Australasian biogeographical regions. The genus Ropalidia is unique because it contains both independent and swarm-founding species. Ropalidia romandi is one of the swarm founding species, meaning that new nests are founded by a large group of workers with a smaller number of inseminated females (egg-laying foundresses), while Ropalidia revolutionalis is independent-founding, meaning that each nest is founded by a single foundress.

Species
Ropalidia contains the following species:

 Ropalidia aethiopica 
 Ropalidia albobalteata 
 Ropalidia amabala 
 Ropalidia anarchica 
 Ropalidia andamanensis 
 Ropalidia antennata 
 Ropalidia aristocratica 
 Ropalidia artifex 
 Ropalidia atra 
 Ropalidia australis 
 Ropalidia bambusae 
 Ropalidia bensoni 
 Ropalidia bicincta 
 Ropalidia bicolor 
 Ropalidia bicolorata 
 Ropalidia bidens 
 Ropalidia binghami 
 Ropalidia bipartita 
 Ropalidia bispinosa 
 Ropalidia brazzai 
 Ropalidia brevita 
 Ropalidia brunnea 
 Ropalidia canaria 
 Ropalidia capensis 
 Ropalidia carinata 
 Ropalidia catharinae 
 Ropalidia cauponae 
 Ropalidia celebensis 
 Ropalidia cincinnata 
 Ropalidia cincta 
 Ropalidia clavata 
 Ropalidia clypeata 
 Ropalidia cocoscola 
 Ropalidia colorata 
 Ropalidia conservator 
 Ropalidia conspicua 
 Ropalidia constitutionalis 
 Ropalidia copiaria 
 Ropalidia crassa 
 Ropalidia crassipunctata 
 Ropalidia cristata 
 Ropalidia curvilineata 
 Ropalidia cyathiformis 
 Ropalidia darwini 
 Ropalidia deceptor 
 Ropalidia decorata 
 Ropalidia deminutiva 
 Ropalidia democratica 
 Ropalidia dichroma 
 Ropalidia dispila 
 Ropalidia distigma 
 Ropalidia dubia 
 Ropalidia ducalis 
 Ropalidia duchaussoyi 
 Ropalidia eboraca 
 Ropalidia elegantula 
 Ropalidia erythrospila 
 Ropalidia eurostoma 
 Ropalidia excavata 
 Ropalidia extrema 
 Ropalidia fasciata 
 Ropalidia favulorum 
 Ropalidia festina 
 Ropalidia flavobrunnea 
 Ropalidia flavopicta 
 Ropalidia flavoviridis 
 Ropalidia fluviatilis 
 Ropalidia formosa 
 Ropalidia fraterna 
 Ropalidia fulvopruinosa 
 Ropalidia galimatia 
 Ropalidia gemmea 
 Ropalidia gracilenta 
 Ropalidia gracilis 
 Ropalidia grandidieri 
 Ropalidia granulata 
 Ropalidia gregaria 
 Ropalidia guttatipennis 
 Ropalidia hirsuta 
 Ropalidia hongkongensis 
 Ropalidia horni 
 Ropalidia impetuosa 
 Ropalidia incurva 
 Ropalidia inquieta 
 Ropalidia interjecta 
 Ropalidia interrupta  
 Ropalidia irrequieta 
 Ropalidia irritata 
 Ropalidia jacobsoni 
 Ropalidia jaculator 
 Ropalidia javanica 
 Ropalidia kojimai 
 Ropalidia kurandae 
 Ropalidia latebalteata 
 Ropalidia latetergum 
 Ropalidia laticincta 
 Ropalidia lefebvrei 
 Ropalidia leopoldi 
 Ropalidia lepida 
 Ropalidia linearecta 
 Ropalidia longipetiolata 
 Ropalidia loriana 
 Ropalidia lugubris 
 Ropalidia luzonensis 
 Ropalidia mackayensis 
 Ropalidia maculata 
 Ropalidia maculiventris 
 Ropalidia magnanima  
 Ropalidia malaisei 
 Ropalidia malayana 
 Ropalidia marginata 
 Ropalidia mathematica 
 Ropalidia melania 
 Ropalidia merina 
 Ropalidia mimikae 
 Ropalidia minor 
 Ropalidia modesta 
 Ropalidia montana 
 Ropalidia mutabilis 
 Ropalidia myosolica 
 Ropalidia mysterica 
 Ropalidia nigerrima 
 Ropalidia nigra 
 Ropalidia nigrescens 
 Ropalidia nigrior 
 Ropalidia nigrita 
 Ropalidia nigrofemorata 
 Ropalidia nilssoni 
 Ropalidia nitidula 
 Ropalidia nobilis 
 Ropalidia novaeguinaea 
 Ropalidia novissima 
 Ropalidia nursei 
 Ropalidia obscura 
 Ropalidia obscurior 
 Ropalidia ochracea 
 Ropalidia opifex 
 Ropalidia opulenta 
 Ropalidia ornaticeps 
 Ropalidia palawana 
 Ropalidia papuana 
 Ropalidia pendula 
 Ropalidia perplexa 
 Ropalidia petulans 
 Ropalidia phalansterica 
 Ropalidia philippinensis 
 Ropalidia pilosa 
 Ropalidia plebeja 
 Ropalidia plebeiana 
 Ropalidia politica 
 Ropalidia prasina 
 Ropalidia principalis 
 Ropalidia proletaria 
 Ropalidia pseudomalayana 
 Ropalidia pulchella 
 Ropalidia ranavali 
 Ropalidia reactionalis 
 Ropalidia regina 
 Ropalidia revolutionalis 
 Ropalidia romandi 
 Ropalidia rosae 
 Ropalidia rufocollaris 
 Ropalidia rufoplagiata 
 Ropalidia sakalava 
 Ropalidia santoshae 
 Ropalidia saussurei 
 Ropalidia schulthessi 
 Ropalidia scitula 
 Ropalidia scottiana 
 Ropalidia sculpturata 
 Ropalidia semihyalineata 
 Ropalidia sericea 
 Ropalidia sexmaculata 
 Ropalidia shestakowi 
 Ropalidia socialis 
 Ropalidia socialistica 
 Ropalidia spatulata 
 Ropalidia spilostoma 
 Ropalidia stigma 
 Ropalidia subclavata 
 Ropalidia sumatrae 
 Ropalidia taiwana 
 Ropalidia thailandia 
 Ropalidia timida 
 Ropalidia tomentosa 
 Ropalidia trichophthalma 
 Ropalidia trimaculata 
 Ropalidia turneri 
 Ropalidia unicolor 
 Ropalidia unidentata 
 Ropalidia variabilis 
 Ropalidia variegata 
 Ropalidia velutina 
 Ropalidia venustula 
 Ropalidia vietnama 
 Ropalidia vitripennis 
 Ropalidia wollastoni 
 Ropalidia zonata

References

Vespidae
Hymenoptera genera
Taxa named by Félix Édouard Guérin-Méneville